The Democritus University of Thrace (DUTH), established in July 1973, is based in Komotini, Greece and has campuses in the Thracian cities of Xanthi, Komotini, Alexandroupoli and Orestiada.

The university today comprises eight schools — School of Humanities, Engineering School, Law School, School of Agricultural Sciences, School of Education Sciences, School of Economic and Social Sciences, School of Health Sciences and School of Physical Education and Sport Sciences and twenty Departments.

As of 2020, there is a student population of 25,919 registered undergraduates and 5,071 registered postgraduate and PhD students, a research and teaching personnel of over 600 as well as approximately 300 administrative staff. 
As a university it is state-owned and fully self-administered. It is thus supervised and subsidized by the Greek State and the Ministry of Education and Religious Affairs. The university plays an important role in strengthening the national and cultural identity of the region of Thrace, and contributes to the high level of education in Greece.

Name and emblem 

The emblem of the Democritus University of Thrace represents the influential Ancient Greek pre-Socratic philosopher Democritus. He was born in Abdera, Thrace and is primarily remembered today for his formulation of an atomic theory of matter.

History 
The university was established in July 1973 and accepted its first students in the academic year 1974–1975. The first departments to operate were the Department of Law and the Department of Civil Engineering. It was named after Democritus, the ancient Greek philosopher who hailed from the town of Abdera in Thrace.

Schools and departments 
The university consists of eight schools and 20 departments.

Research
The research strategy of DUTH aims at one hand to further support its academic and outward-looking character and on the other hand to promote its social role.

Academic evaluation
In 2016 the external evaluation committee gave Democritus University of Thrace a Positive evaluation.

An external evaluation of all academic departments in Greek universities was conducted by the Hellenic Quality Assurance and Accreditation Agency (HQA).

See also 
 Aristotle University of Thessaloniki, founded in 1925, it is the largest university in Macedonia, Greece.
 List of universities in Greece
 List of research institutes in Greece
 European Higher Education Area
 Balkan Universities Network
 Outline of academic disciplines
 Education in Greece

References

External links 

 Democritus University of Thrace 
 DUTH Internal Quality Assurance Unit   
 DUTH DASTA Office (Career Office & Innovation Unit)   
 DUTH Information Technology and Communications Office   
 Hellenic Authority for Higher Education (HAHE) 
 Study in Greece – Official portal for studies in Greece 
 "ATHENA" Plan for Higher Education   
 Hellenic Academic Libraries Link (HEAL-Link)) 
 Kallipos (e-books Greek academic publishing) 
 Greek Research and Technology Network (GRNET) 
 okeanos (GRNET's cloud service) 

Universities in Greece
University
Education in Eastern Macedonia and Thrace
Educational institutions established in 1973
1973 establishments in Greece
Buildings and structures in Komotini
Xanthi
Buildings and structures in Evros (regional unit)
Alexandroupolis
Orestiada